Samo par godina za nas is the fifth studio album by the Serbian rock band Ekatarina Velika, released in 1989. It is the last one recorded with Bojan Pečar as a bassist. The album was produced by Mitar "Suba" Subotić, Theodore Yanni and Ekatarina Velika, with Suba and Yanni also included as guest stars. Another guest star was Tanja Jovićević (the lead singer of the band Oktobar 1864) on backing vocals and Zvonimir Đukić on guitar.

In November 2006, "Par godina za nas" was voted the best former Yugoslav popular music song (on the B92 Top 100 Domestic Songs list) by the listeners of Serbian B92 radio.

Track listing

Personnel

Milan Mladenović - vocals, guitar
Margita Stefanović - piano, keyboards
Bojan Pečar - bass
Žika Todorović - drums

References

External links

Ekatarina Velika albums
1989 albums
PGP-RTB albums